The A217 is a road in London and Surrey in England. It runs north–south. It runs from Kings Road in Fulham, London, crosses the Thames at Wandsworth Bridge, then passes through Wandsworth, Earlsfield, Summerstown, Tooting, Mitcham, Rosehill and Sutton Common in Sutton, then Cheam. Then, widened as a dual carriageway, comes Belmont, a suburban district built on a slope rising southward. On the North Downs in Surrey the road then skirts past Banstead and through its late 19th century offspring villages particularly Burgh Heath and Kingswood, Surrey. It then crosses the M25 motorway at Junction 8, then, returning to single carriageways, passes through the castle town of Reigate. It then cuts through the green buffer farmland of two rural villages and terminates at the road network at Gatwick Airport's northern perimeter.

Route

Fulham to Tooting
The A217 starts as a non-primary A-road named Wandsworth Bridge Road, Fulham in the London Borough of Hammersmith & Fulham and runs for 0.8 miles (1.3 km) before crossing over the River Thames at Wandsworth Bridge. The road enters the town and London borough of Wandsworth. The road turns right at a roundabout on to Swandon Way, becoming a primary route for a short stretch (as a continuation of the A3205), before passing Wandsworth Town railway station. It is briefly called Fairfield St before meeting the A3 (Wandsworth High St.).

The road reverts to non-primary status, and changes name to Garratt Lane, passing Southside shopping centre, before it heads out of Wandsworth and into Earlsfield. It passes the B234 shortly before reaching Earlsfield railway station. It continues through Summerstown as Garratt Lane and the road passes the B229 (Burntwood Lane) before it reaches Streatham Cemetery.

In Lower Tooting, it meets Tooting Broadway, a busy junction with the A24 and tube station, before becoming Mitcham Road and passing the B241 (Rectory Lane). It passes Tooting railway station and this is where the road exits the London Borough of Wandsworth.

Mitcham to Belmont 

It becomes London Road as it enters the London Borough of Merton. It continues through the one-way system at Mitcham and passes Mitcham tram station before becoming Bishopsford Road.

The road enters the St Helier Estate, firstly in the Morden area before the Carshalton part in the [London Borough of Sutton.] The road reaches Rosehill, which contains a busy 6-way roundabout, before becoming a primary class A-road as it becomes Reigate Avenue (effectively the Sutton by-pass.) As the Sutton by-pass, the road passes the B279 (Sutton Common Road) and Sutton Common area, which changes name to Oldfields Road and passes the Tesco superstore in the Kimpton Park commercial and industrial area on the edge of North Cheam. It passes a crossroads with Gander Green Lane and becomes St Dunstans Hill before reaching a junction in Cheam with the A232 (High St and Ewell Road). It becomes Belmont Rise and goes past a crossroads with Northey Avenue and the road leaves the suburban area of Belmont, as well as Greater London.

Bishopsford Road Bridge

Details

The A217 crosses the River Wandle in Mitcham on Bishopsford Road Bridge, also known as Mitcham Bridge.

Flood and collapse

On 10 June 2019, unusually high river waters began while the bridge was being surfaced.  Jack posts had been placed underneath to support the vehicles and machinery.  These trapped debris (branches, weeds etc.) for four days.

This led to the partial collapse of the northern arch on 14 June 2019. The southern arch was unaffected and the central arch suffered minor structural damage. Due to the collapse, the road is anticipated to reopen by the onset of Summer 2021.

The Borough Council's repair work involved FM Conway and the Environment Agency. They have stabilised the bridge, pre-inspection and repair. Crack-injection and underpinning has secured the central arch. Bed scouring to the west has been filled with stone and gravel; that under the north arch, with marine concrete.

Works halted for insurance investigators to inspect for evidence of liability.

Banstead to Lower Kingswood 
At the road enters Surrey, it meets the B2230 again at a roundabout to the south of Belmont before entering the notorious 'Mad Mile' section (Brighton Road). The speed limit changes from 40 to 70 mph (113 km/h), quickly down to 60 mph and returns to 40 mph at the Banstead Crossroads junction with the A2022.

For the next 5 miles, the road has an unbroken chain of average speed cameras, all of which the speed limit is 40 mph. In this area the road passes Banstead Downs, and its golf course. After passing the Banstead Crossroads, it acts as a boundary between Nork and Banstead as it heads towards Burgh Heath, passing the junctions with Garratts Lane (B2219) and Tattenham Way (B2221) before reaching the A240 (Reigate Road) at the centre of Burgh Heath.

It passes near the large suburban villages of Tadworth and Kingswood, passing several B-roads, including the B2032. It travels beside Banstead Heath (still as Brighton Road) before reaching the small settlement of Lower Kingswood. After passing a roundabout near Kingswood Manor, the road arrives at the Reigate Hill Interchange, which is also Junction 8 of the M25.

Reigate to Horley 
At this point, the A217 becomes a non-primary A-road. It is now named Reigate Hill, in a very steep section of the North Downs. The area become more urban at the bottom of the hill, on the northern outskirts of the town of Reigate. It passes through a level crossing next to Reigate station. It runs concurrently with the A25 through the main one-way system of Reigate town centre. It carries on through the localities of Woodhatch and Doversgreen before going into a very rural area. It travels over the River Mole in the small hamlet of Sidlow. After a period of farms, the road passes the village of Hookwood, taking a left turn at a roundabout. Continuing past Povey Cross, the road reaches Longbridge Roundabout on the border with West Sussex.

Landmarks on the route
Wandsworth Bridge
The converted Young's Brewery
South Thames College and Southside Wandsworth
Earlsfield railway station
Tooting Broadway tube station
Tooting railway station
Figges Marsh (Park), Tooting
Mitcham Cricket Green
Mitcham tram stop and Station House
Rosehill Recreation Ground
Banstead Downs
Banstead Heath
Reigate College, Town Hall and castle ruins/tunnel
Sidlow Bridge over the River Mole, Surrey
Holiday Inn Gatwick/Longbridge Roundabout/Best Western Gatwick Moat House

Major roads intersected by the route
A3 and A205 South Circular Road at Wandsworth
A24 at Tooting
A232 at Cheam
M25 at Junction 8
A25 at Reigate

Illegal racing at Banstead
The stretch of the A217 nicknamed The Mad Mile has been a focal point of illegal street racing since the mid-20th century. It is a straight length of dual carriageway which runs downhill from the Banstead crossroads with the A2022 to the roundabout with the B2230 near Belmont.

The road's notoriety developed shortly after World War II due to the increasing affordability and popularity of motorbikes and cars. During the early 1980s, bikers illegally marked out "starting grids" at either end of the Mile on more than one occasion, which were later scrubbed out by the local authority; this activity restarted in the early 2000s among wayward modified car enthusiasts, whose races would often take place on Thursday nights. Information regarding races spread quickly through increasing use of the Internet and some participants and spectators travelled to races from as far away as Birmingham. Police presence gradually diffused this illegal activity, but it has not completely disappeared. Measures to stop these races include barriers erected on the centre grass verge which runs the length of this stretch, where people used to park to watch illegal road use.

Fatal incidents

In August 2006 two men illegally racing along this stretch of a public highway caused an accident that killed three people, a separate offence, and were sentenced to imprisonment for a term of years. Aggravating the offence committed, the conviction found from the evidence in the case that the two men were driving recklessly at a speed much faster than the  limit on the road at the point of the accident.

References

External links
SABRE Roads By Ten – A217

Roads in West Sussex
Roads in London
Roads in Surrey
Streets in the London Borough of Hammersmith and Fulham
Streets in the London Borough of Wandsworth
Transport in the London Borough of Merton
Transport in the London Borough of Sutton